Youbian dubian, or dubanbian, is a rule of thumb people use to pronounce a Chinese character when they do not know its exact pronunciation. A longer version is '' (yǒu biān dú biān, méi biān dú zhōngjiān; lit. "read the side if any; read the middle part if there is no side").

Around 90% of Chinese characters are phono-semantic compounds that consist of two parts: a semantic part (often the radical) that suggests a general meaning (e.g. the part  [shell] usually indicates that a character concerns commerce, as people used shells as currency in ancient times), and a phonetic part which shows how the character is or was pronounced (e.g. the part  (pinyin: huáng) usually indicates that a character is pronounced huáng in Mandarin Chinese).

The phonetic part represents the exact or almost-exact pronunciation of the character when the character was first created; characters sharing the same phonetic part had identical or similar readings. Linguists rely heavily on this fact to reconstruct the sounds of ancient Chinese. However, over time, the reading of a character may be no longer the one indicated by the phonetic part due to sound change and general vagueness.

When one encounters such a two-part character and does not know its exact pronunciation, one may take one of the parts as the phonetic indicator. For example, reading  (pinyin: yì) as zhǐ because its "side"  is pronounced as such. Some of this kind of "folk reading" have become acceptable over time - listed in dictionaries as alternative pronunciations, or simply become the common reading. It has been called a "phenomenon of analogy", and is observed in as early as the Song Dynasty.

See also
 Spelling pronunciation
 The Chinese Language: Fact and Fantasy

Notes

External links

 Feng, Shouzhong (S: 冯寿忠, T: 馮壽忠, P: Féng Shòuzhōng), 《与读半边有关的常用字》 (Archive), 语言文字网 Yǔyán Wénzì Wǎng。

Chinese characters